Oreodera is a genus of beetles in the family Cerambycidae, containing the following species:

 Oreodera achatina Erichson, 1847
 Oreodera adornata Martins & Galileo, 2005
 Oreodera advena Martins & Galileo, 2005
 Oreodera aerumnosa Erichson, 1847
 Oreodera aestiva Neouze & Tavakilian, 2010
 Oreodera affinis Gahan, 1892
 Oreodera aglaia Monné & Fragoso, 1988
 Oreodera albata Villiers, 1971
 Oreodera albicans Monné & Fragoso, 1988
 Oreodera albilatera Martins & Monné, 1993
 Oreodera aliciae McCarty, 2005
 Oreodera amabilis Monné & Fragoso, 1988
 Oreodera basicretata Neouze & Tavakilian, 2010
 Oreodera basipenicillata Tippmann, 1960
 Oreodera basiradiata Tippmann, 1960
 Oreodera beneluzi Neouze & Tavakilian, 2010
 Oreodera bituberculata Bates, 1861
 Oreodera boliviana Tippmann, 1960
 Oreodera boucheri Neouze & Tavakilian, 2010
 Oreodera brailovskyi Chemsak & Noguera, 1993
 Oreodera c-album Bates, 1872
 Oreodera candida Marinoni & Martins, 1978
 Oreodera canotogata Bates, 1872
 Oreodera charisoma Lane, 1955
 Oreodera chemsaki McCarty, 2001
 Oreodera cinerea Audinet-Serville, 1835
 Oreodera cocoensis (Linsley & Chemsak, 1966)
 Oreodera copei McCarty, 2001
 Oreodera corticina Thomson, 1865
 Oreodera costaricensis Thomson, 1865
 Oreodera cretata Bates, 1861
 Oreodera cretifera Pascoe, 1859
 Oreodera crinita Monné & Fragoso, 1988
 Oreodera curiosa Galileo & Martins, 2007
 Oreodera curvata Martins & Monné, 1993
 Oreodera dalensi Tavkilian & Neouze, 2011
 Oreodera durantoni Neouze & Tavakilian, 2010
 Oreodera exigua Monné & Fragoso, 1988
 Oreodera fasciculosa Thomson, 1865
 Oreodera feuilleti Neouze & Tavakilian, 2010
 Oreodera flavopunctata Fuchs, 1958
 Oreodera fluctuosa Bates, 1861
 Oreodera forsteri Tippmann, 1960
 Oreodera glauca (Linnaeus, 1758)
 Oreodera goudoti (White, 1855)
 Oreodera granulifera Bates, 1872
 Oreodera granulipennis Zajciw, 1963
 Oreodera graphiptera Bates, 1885
 Oreodera griseozonata Bates, 1861
 Oreodera hassenteufeli (Fuchs, 1959)
 Oreodera hoffmanni (Thomson, 1860)
 Oreodera hovorei Neouze & Tavakilian, 2010
 Oreodera howdeni Monné & Fragoso, 1988
 Oreodera inscripta Bates, 1872
 Oreodera jacquieri Thomson, 1865
 Oreodera kawensis Neouze & Tavakilian, 2010
 Oreodera lanei Monné & Fragoso, 1988
 Oreodera larrei Neouze & Tavakilian, 2010
 Oreodera lateralis (Olivier, 1795)
 Oreodera leucostigma Monné & Fragoso, 1988
 Oreodera lezamai Hovore, 1989
 Oreodera luteogrisea Neouze & Tavakilian, 2010
 Oreodera macropoda Marinoni & Martins, 1978
 Oreodera mageia Martins, Galileo & Tavakilian, 2008
 Oreodera magnifica Martins & Monné, 1993
 Oreodera magnoi Monné & Fragoso, 1988
 Oreodera marinonii Monné & Fragoso, 1988
 Oreodera melzeri Monné & Fragoso, 1988
 Oreodera mimetica Lane, 1970
 Oreodera minima Galileo & Martins, 1999
 Oreodera mocoiatira Galileo & Martins, 1998
 Oreodera modesta Monné & Fragoso, 1988
 Oreodera morvanae Neouze & Tavakilian, 2010
 Oreodera neglecta Melzer, 1932
 Oreodera nivea Martins & Galileo, 2005
 Oreodera noguerai McCarty, 2001
 Oreodera obsoleta Bates, 1874
 Oreodera occulta Monné & Fragoso, 1988
 Oreodera ohausi Melzer, 1930
 Oreodera olivaceotincta Tippmann, 1953
 Oreodera olivosimplex Neouze & Tavakilian, 2010
 Oreodera omissa Melzer, 1932
 Oreodera paulista Tippmann, 1953
 Oreodera podagrica Neouze & Tavakilian, 2010
 Oreodera purpurascens Bates, 1880
 Oreodera pustulosa Monné & Fragoso, 1988
 Oreodera quinquetuberculata (Drapiez, 1820)
 Oreodera rhytisma Monné & Fragoso, 1988
 Oreodera roppai Monné & Fragoso, 1988
 Oreodera rufofasciata Bates, 1861
 Oreodera seabrai Monné & Fragoso, 1988
 Oreodera semialba Bates, 1874
 Oreodera semiporosa Tippmann, 1960
 Oreodera sensibilis Galileo & Martins, 2007
 Oreodera seraisorum Neouze & Tavakilian, 2010
 Oreodera sericata Bates, 1861
 Oreodera sexplagiata Melzer, 1931
 Oreodera simplex Bates, 1861
 Oreodera sororcula Martins & Monné, 1993
 Oreodera stictica Monné & Fragoso, 1988
 Oreodera tenebrosa Thomson, 1864
 Oreodera tijuca Marinoni & Martins, 1978
 Oreodera triangularis Galileo & Martins, 2007
 Oreodera trinitensis Neouze & Tavakilian, 2010
 Oreodera tuberculata Thomson, 1864
 Oreodera tuberculifera Galileo & Martins, 2007
 Oreodera tuberosa Monné & Fragoso, 1988
 Oreodera turnbowi McCarty, 2001
 Oreodera undulata Bates, 1861
 Oreodera veronicae Neouze & Tavakilian, 2010
 Oreodera verrucosa Bates, 1872
 Oreodera vulgata Monné & Fragoso, 1988
 Oreodera wappesi McCarty, 2001
 Oreodera zikani Melzer, 1930

References

 
Cerambycidae genera